Diaphus anderseni, the Andersen's lantern fish, is a species of lanternfish 
found in the Atlantic and Indian Oceans.

Size

Etymology
The fish is named in honor of Tåning's friend, N. C. Andersen, physician on board the Danish research vessel Dana which embarqued on different cruises in the northern and the southern seas.

References

Myctophidae
Taxa named by Åge Vedel Tåning
Fish described in 1932